The following is a list of episodes from the television series, Big Wolf on Campus.

There are 22 episodes each in Seasons 1 and 2. There are 21 episodes in Season 3. The total number of aired episodes is 65.

Series overview

Episodes

Season 1 (1999)

Season 2 (2000)

Season 3 (2001–02)

Lists of fantasy television series episodes